"Met Him Last Night" is a song by American singer Demi Lovato featuring fellow American singer Ariana Grande. The song was originally released on April 2, 2021 as the ninth track on Lovato's seventh studio album Dancing with the Devil... the Art of Starting Over. It was later serviced to US contemporary hit radio by Island Records on April 13, 2021 as the album’s fourth and final single. "Met Him Last Night" was written by Grande alongside Albert Stanaj, Tommy Brown, and Courageous Xavier "Xavi" Herrera, and was produced by Grande, Brown and Xavi, with vocal production by Mitch Allan. At the 64th Annual Grammy Awards, the Dave Audé remix of the song was nominated for Best Remixed Recording.

Background
"Met Him Last Night" was revealed as a track from Demi Lovato's seventh studio album Dancing with the Devil... the Art of Starting Over in March 2021, with Lovato confirming it was a late addition to the album, having been recorded in the three weeks prior. 

After Lovato played Ariana Grande some songs from the then-forthcoming album in 2019, Grande began to write "Met Him Last Night" specifically with Lovato's story in mind, and Grande originally did not wish to appear on the song herself, with Lovato revealing "She was like, 'No, no, I'll be like mystery, harmony lady'. And I was like 'I feel like the world would love to hear us together, like we should do that'. And she was like, 'Are you sure?' And I was like, 'Yes'. And so she added her vocals and, she's [just so] talented, so great. I'm so grateful to have a friend like her".

Lovato stated the song is "best representative" of a period in her life discussed in the documentary series Demi Lovato: Dancing with the Devil, which involves "the downfalls of recovery" and that "sometimes you slip up", presumably referencing a slip-up had after a "week-long intensive trauma retreat" due to calling up her drug dealer in hopes of trying to "rewrite his choice of violating me".

The song is a follow-up to Lovato's prior single "Dancing with the Devil", as "Met Him Last Night" features the "Devil" as the seductive title character and antagonist that Lovato and Grande sing about meeting up with.

Track listing
Dave Audé remix – single
 "Met Him Last Night" (featuring Ariana Grande) [Dave Audé Remix] – 3:44

Composition
"Met Him Last Night" was described by Billboard as "a dark, twisted fantasy about chilling with the devil and finding out that, well, he's kind of a funny, chill dude who might be relationship material", containing the lyrics "I've seen the devil, yeah, I met him last night/ One conversation, now he's spendin' the night," which an "urgent" Lovato sings "in a couplet that clearly has a much deeper meaning about flirting with disaster."

Reception
In reviews of Dancing with the Devil... the Art of Starting Over, "Met Him Last Night" was referred to by NME as a "dark and atmospheric electro bop", and Neil McCormick from The Daily Telegraph highlighted the song as not only "a flirty duet in which the seductive title character is the Devil" that "succeeds in both acknowledging the dangers of the high life and making fun of them at the same time," but that it reflects the way in which Lovato's album as an entirety pleasurably "succeeds in grappling with serious matters without jettisoning any of the lightness, melodiousness, nimble rhythms and sugar-high hooks of her pop genre."

Credits and personnel
Recording and management
Mixed at MixStar Studios (Virginia Beach, Virginia)
Mastered at Sterling Sound Studios (Edgewater, New Jersey)
Published by Thomas Lee Brown (ASCAP), Space Goats Publishing (BMI), Universal Music Group Corp. (ASCAP), GrandAri Music (ASCAP), Albert Stanaj (BMI)

Personnel
Demi Lovato – vocals
Ariana Grande – vocals, composition
Tommy Brown – composition, production
Courageous Xavier Herrera – composition, production
Albert Stanaj – composition
Mitch Allan – vocal production
Billy Hickey – recording
Serban Ghenea – mixing
John Hanes – engineering
Peter Lee Johnson – strings
Chris Gehringer – mastering

Credits adapted from the liner notes of Dancing with the Devil... the Art of Starting Over.

Charts

Release history

References

2021 songs
2021 singles
Demi Lovato songs
Ariana Grande songs
Island Records singles
Republic Records singles
Songs written by Ariana Grande
Songs written by Tommy Brown (record producer)
Song recordings produced by Tommy Brown (record producer)